Horst Haecks (12 August 1936 – 21 July 2010) was a German professional footballer who played as a forward for FC St. Pauli.

Career
He played for Eisenbahner TSV Altona,  HEBC Hamburg and Eimsbuetteler SV as a youth player. Haecks was forced to retire from professional playing at the age of 30 after persistent knee problems during the 1966–67 season. He scored 161 goals in 265 official matches for FC St. Pauli.

In July 1969, three years after his retirement, he made his comeback for the FC St. Pauli reserve team when it famously beat the club's first team in the NFV-Pokal, Lower Saxony's regional qualification for the DFB-Pokal.

Death
Haecks died on 21 July 2010, aged 73.

References

External links
 

1936 births
2010 deaths
Footballers from Hamburg
German footballers
Association football forwards
FC St. Pauli players
West German footballers
HEBC Hamburg players